The coronation of the Danish monarch was a religious ceremony in which the accession of the Danish monarch was marked by a coronation ceremony. It was held in various forms from 1170 to 1840, mostly in Lund Cathedral in Lund, St. Mary's Cathedral in Copenhagen and in the chapel of Frederiksborg Palace in Hillerød.

Enthronements of the Danish monarch may be historically divided into three distinct types of rituals: the medieval coronation, which existed during the period of elective monarchy; the anointing ritual, which replaced coronation with the introduction of absolute monarchy in 1660; and finally the simple proclamation, which has been used since the introduction of the constitutional monarchy in 1849.

Coronations of the elective monarchy 

Historically an elective monarchy, the Danish kings had been elected and acclaimed at the Thing assemblies; this continued even after the tradition of coronations began. Ultimately, the acclamation rite only ceased with the introduction of hereditary monarchy in 1660, the 1657 acclamation of crown prince Christian (the later Christian V of Denmark) being the last occasion. The first coronation in Scandinavia took place in Bergen in Norway in 1163 or 1164. The first coronation in Denmark was that of Canute VI in St. Bendt's Church in Ringsted in 1170.

The medieval monarchs used various locations for their coronations, with Lund Cathedral in Lund, the archepiscopal seat of Denmark, being the most preferred. Other locations include Viborg, Vordingborg, Kalmar and Ribe. After the accession of the House of Oldenburg to the Danish throne in 1448, the coronations were held in St. Mary's Cathedral in Copenhagen, and usually performed by the Bishop of Zealand.

The coronation ritual (as of 1537) began with a procession of the ruler and his consort into St. Mary's cathedral in Copenhagen, followed by the Danish Crown Regalia. The monarch was seated before the altar, where he swore to govern justly, preserve the Lutheran religion, support schools, and help the poor. Following this, the king was anointed on the lower right arm and between the shoulders, but not on the head. Then the royal couple retired to a tented enclosure where they were robed in royal attire, returning to hear a sermon, the Kyrie and Gloria, and then a prayer and the Epistle reading.

Following the Epistle, the king knelt before the altar, where he was first given a sword. After flourishing and sheathing it, the still-kneeling monarch was crowned by the clergy and nobility, who jointly placed the diadem upon their ruler's head. The sceptre and orb were presented, then returned to attendants. The queen was anointed and crowned in a similar manner, but she received only a sceptre and not an orb. Finally, a choral hymn was sung, following which the newly crowned king and queen listened to a second sermon and the reading of the Gospel, which brought the service to an end.

Anointings of the absolute monarchy 

With the introduction of absolute monarchy in 1660, the full coronation ritual was replaced with a ceremony of anointing, where the new king would arrive at the coronation site already wearing the crown, where he was then anointed.

The anointings were held in the chapel of Frederiksborg Palace in Hillerød, with the exception of the 1767 anointing of King Christian VII which was held in the chapel of Christiansborg Palace in Copenhagen.

Proclamations of the constitutional monarchy 
This rite was in turn abolished with the introduction of the Danish constitution in 1849. Today the crown of Denmark is only displayed at the monarch's funeral, when it sits atop their coffin. The present queen, Margrethe II, did not have any formal enthronement service; a public announcement of her accession was made from the balcony of Christiansborg Palace, with the new sovereign being acclaimed by her prime minister at the time (1972), Jens Otto Krag, then cheered with a ninefold "hurrah" by the crowds below.

Historical list of coronations

Coronations

Anointings (1660–1849)

See also 
 Coronations
 Monarchy of Denmark
 Coronation Chair of Denmark

Notes

References 
 
 

Danish monarchy
Denmark
Ceremonies in Denmark